"Born with a Smile on My Face" is a popular song written by Roger Holman and Simon May. Included as the first track on the 1974 album Rain Featuring Stephanie De-Sykes, the single peaked at number two in the United Kingdom and number 19 in Australia.

Charts

References

1974 songs
1974 singles